Pachai Vilakku may refer to:
 Pachhai Vilakku (1964 film)
 Pachai Vilakku (2020 film)